Girlfight is a 2000 American sports drama film written and directed by Karyn Kusama and starring Michelle Rodriguez in both of their film debuts. It follows Diana Guzman, a troubled teenager from Brooklyn who decides to channel her aggression by training to become a boxer, despite the disapproval of both her father and her prospective trainers and competitors in the male-dominated sport.

Kusama wrote the screenplay for Girlfight after learning to box, wanting to make a film about the sport with a female protagonist. Although she struggled to find financiers for the film's $1 million (U.S.) budget, the production was eventually funded by John Sayles, Maggie Renzi and the Independent Film Channel. Rodriguez was cast in the lead role, despite having never acted before, and trained for four months to prepare for the role before filming commenced in New York and New Jersey.

Girlfight premiered on January 22, 2000, at the Sundance Film Festival, where it won the Grand Jury Prize. It was released theatrically on September 29, 2000, and grossed $1.7 million at the box office. The film was well received by critics, who offered particular praise to Rodriguez for her performance and Kusama for her direction. Both Kusama and Rodriguez received numerous accolades, including two National Board of Review Awards, two Independent Spirit Award nominations, and two Gotham Awards.

Plot
Diana Guzman is a Brooklyn teenager whose hot temper gets her into trouble at school as she repeatedly starts fights with other students. Her frustration stems from her unhappy home life; she lives in a public housing estate with her brother Tiny and their single father, Sandro. Sandro pays for Tiny's boxing training in hopes of his becoming a professional boxer, although Tiny would prefer to be an artist.

After visiting Tiny's gym and intervening in a spar to defend him, Diana asks the trainers to let her box, too. She is told she can train there, but not compete in actual fights. When she learns that she cannot afford coaching from Tiny's trainer, Hector Soto, she asks her father for an allowance but he tells her to get a job. She resorts to stealing his money instead and returns to the gym, where Hector begins to teach her the basics of boxing.

Diana's first spar is with Adrian Sturges, whom she later meets again when Hector takes her to a professional fight. Adrian invites Diana to dinner after the fight and kisses her after walking her home. One night after a spar which gave Diana a black eye, Sandro sees Diana and Adrian together and confronts her, assuming that she is in an abusive relationship. She storms out of the apartment and spends the night with Adrian. When he asks about her parents, she reveals that her mother died by suicide several years ago. When Diana returns to her apartment, Tiny offers to give up boxing so that she can use the coaching money he gets from their father.

Diana later goes to Hector's birthday party, but leaves when she sees Adrian getting friendly with his ex-girlfriend. When Diana and Adrian spar at their next session in the gym, he is reluctant to hit her, and she leaves before he can talk to her. Diana's first amateur match is scheduled against another girl, but when her opponent pulls out she ends up fighting a man, Ray Cortez. Sandro arrives in the middle of the fight to see the match end in Ray's disqualification for illegal shoving. When Diana arrives home, Sandro berates her for looking like a loser. She retaliates by beating him to the floor and accuses him of abusing her mother to the point of suicide.

After weeks of rigorous training, Diana wins another amateur fight, this time against a girl, Ricki Stiles. Although Diana has accepted Adrian's apology, tensions rise between them again when they learn that they both have advanced to the finals in their division to fight each other. Adrian refuses to fight a girl and Diana struggles to convince him to view her as a legitimate opponent. He turns up for the fight on the day, however, and after an even match, Diana wins with a unanimous decision by the judges. After the fight, Adrian fears that he has lost Diana's respect, but she tells him she respects him even more for fighting her, and they reconcile.

Cast
 Michelle Rodriguez as Diana Guzman
 Jaime Tirelli as Hector Soto
 Paul Calderón as Sandro Guzman
 Santiago Douglas as Adrian Sturges
 Ray Santiago as Tiny Guzman
 Victor Sierra as Ray Cortez
 Elisa Bocanegra as Marisol
 Shannon Walker Williams as Veronica
 Louis Guss as Don
 Herb Lovelle as Cal

Production

Girlfight was written and directed by Karyn Kusama, marking her feature film debut. Her aim was to subvert "the classic boxing story" with a female lead, having taken up boxing herself in 1992 at the famous Gleason's Gym in Brooklyn. After writing the script, she struggled to persuade production companies to finance the film; numerous producers suggested that Kusama cast a white woman in the lead role rather than a Latina and felt that having a female protagonist was "unappealing [and] unbelievable". Maggie Renzi, Sarah Green and Martha Griffin eventually agreed to produce the film, and found a financier in 1999 to provide the $1 million (U.S.) budget. Two days before pre-production on the film was set to begin the financier backed out, but Renzi and her partner John Sayles—an independent filmmaker and Kusama's former mentor—decided to provide funding for the film's entire budget themselves. The Independent Film Channel later contributed $300,000 towards the budget.

Kusama initially sought to cast a professional actor to play Diana but felt that many of those who auditioned were overly feminized and "polished" and decided to cast an untrained actor instead. Michelle Rodriguez, who had worked as a film extra but had never auditioned for a speaking role before, attended an open casting call for the lead. Although Kusama described Rodriguez's audition as "a disaster", she won the role because out of 350 auditionees Kusama "could not find anyone who could come close to her in physical power". Since Rodriguez was not a boxer, she trained at Gleason's Gym five to six days a week for four months in preparation for filming, as did Santiago Douglas, who played Adrian.

Girlfight was filmed over 24 days in New York and New Jersey. For scenes inside the gym where Diana and Tiny train, the filmmakers shot in a warehouse in Jersey City. The initial boxing sequences were shot from a spectator's view outside of the ring but later sequences were filmed more intimately from inside the ring. Cinematographer Patrick Cady used camera rigs that allowed the actors to hit him or the camera itself to mimic the feeling of being hit.

Release
Girlfight premiered on January 22, 2000, at the Sundance Film Festival, where it won the festival's Grand Jury Prize and the Directing Award in Dramatic Competition. Distribution rights to the film were subsequently purchased by Screen Gems for $3 million.

It had a limited release in the United States on September 29, 2000, opening in 28 theaters. In its debut week, it ranked 30th at the box office, grossing $282,145 with a per-screen average of $10,077. The following week it expanded to 253 theaters, but fell to a per-screen average of $2,687, ranking 18th. In its third week, the film's per-screen average dropped to $1,156 with a cumulative total gross of $1,254,600. Girlfight ended its theatrical run after five weeks with a total domestic gross of $1,565,852. Internationally, it grossed $100,176, making a worldwide total of $1,666,028.

The film was released on DVD on March 27, 2001. The DVD includes two special features: an audio commentary by Karyn Kusama and a "making of" featurette.

Reception

Critical response
Girlfight was well received by critics upon its release. It has a score of 88% on Rotten Tomatoes, based on 129 reviews with an average rating of 7.4 out of 10. The website's critical consensus states: "Michelle Rodriguez gives a compelling performance, despite lack of a boxing background; Karyn Kusama packs a punch with this directorial debut." The film has a score of 70 out of 100 on Metacritic, based on 34 critics' reviews, indicating "generally favorable reviews".

Numerous reviews praised Rodriguez's performance in her debut role, with several critics comparing her to Marlon Brando. David Denby of The New Yorker called her "a powerhouse star who could go a long way", while Variety critic Emanuel Levy described her as "a natural performer who dominates every scene". In a review for The New York Times, A. O. Scott characterized Rodriguez as "a powerful, extraordinarily gifted young actress ... Remember the name." The Washington Post Desson Howe felt that Rodriguez's performance was the most memorable aspect of the film, and that she "becomes more appealing, formidable and beautiful by the scene".

Karyn Kusama's script and direction were also highlighted by critics. The Los Angeles Times Kenneth Turan commended her "craft, empathy and respect" and compared her to the character of Diana, writing that Kusama "is her protagonist's double in terms of drive, commitment and ability". Lisa Schwarzbaum of Entertainment Weekly felt that, although the plot was clichéd and unrealistic at times, Kusama's direction showed "a clear, personal filmmaking style ... and a respect for her characters' weaknesses as well as their moments of athletic beauty". James Berardinelli gave the film three and a half stars out of four, calling it "a well crafted and emotionally satisfying debut" and applauding Kusama's "single-minded determination and a passion for the project".

Roger Ebert, who gave the film three and a half out of four stars in a Chicago Sun-Times review, enjoyed that the story is "always about more than boxing" with its deeper themes "about a girl growing up in a macho society and ... discovering she has a nature probably more macho than the men around her". On the other hand, the San Francisco Chronicle Edward Guthmann opined that Kusama "ultimately undercuts her theme of female self-reliance by having Diana fall for Adrian" and criticized the plot for "tak[ing] too much time justifying a woman's right to be in the ring – instead of celebrating her achievement".

Accolades

Legacy
Girlfight was one of the first boxing films to portray women in the sport. Film studies academic Katharina Lindner has argued that Girlfight was responsible for the "influx of female protagonists into the [boxing film] genre" of the 2000s, specifically the 2004 films Million Dollar Baby and Die Boxerin (alternatively titled About a Girl).

The film was responsible for launching Rodriguez and Kusama's careers in film; Rodriguez went on to star in numerous major studio films while Kusama later directed Æon Flux (2005) and Jennifer's Body (2009).

References

External links
 
 

2000s teen drama films
2000 films
American teen drama films
American boxing films
2000s English-language films
Films about women's sports
Films directed by Karyn Kusama
Films set in Brooklyn
Films shot in New Jersey
Films shot in New York (state)
Hispanic and Latino American drama films
Screen Gems films
Sundance Film Festival award winners
Films scored by Theodore Shapiro
2000 directorial debut films
2000 drama films
2000s feminist films
Spanish-language American films
2000s American films
2000 independent films
American independent films